Alexander Peya and Bruno Soares were the defending champions, but lost in the final to Treat Huey and Dominic Inglot, 5–7, 7–5, [8–10].

Seeds

Draw

Draw

References
Main draw

Aegon Internationalandnbsp;- Doubles
2014 Men's Doubles